Roseacre is a suburb of Johannesburg, South Africa. It is located in Region F of the City of Johannesburg Metropolitan Municipality.

History
Prior to the discovery of gold on the Witwatersrand in 1886, the suburb lay on land on one of the original farms called Klipriviersberg. It was a proclaimed a suburb on 14 May 1947 and named after the lands owner, William Harrison and his home town of Roseacre, Lancashire.

References

Johannesburg Region F